Jean van den Bosch (27 January 1910 – 15 December 1985) was a Belgian diplomat.

Biography 
Jean van den Bosch was born on 27 January 1910 in Ghent, Belgium. He received a doctorate in law from the Université catholique de Louvain in 1931. The following year he earned degrees in history and diplomatic political science.

Career 
Van den Bosch began his diplomatic career in 1934. On 2 July 1960 van den Bosch arrived in Léopoldville, capital of the newly independent Republic of the Congo (formerly the Belgian Congo) to serve as ambassador. Two days later he presented his credentials to President Joseph Kasa-Vubu. In the subsequent Congo Crisis, Van den Bosch wanted to avoid a total administrative collapse and worked to ensure the retention of Belgian personnel in the civil service. In doing so he established contacts with ONUC, Congolese ministers in favor of a strong relationship with Belgium, and certain ministries (namely Finance, Economic Affairs, and External Commerce). He also communicated with the remaining Belgian civil servants who were anxious about serving in an administration that had the disapproval of the Belgian government, advising those in the employment of moderate ministers or the Presidency to continue their work while cautioning those attached to the "extremists" to avoid any undertakings that would harm Belgian interests. Relations between Belgium and the Congo quickly deteriorated, however, and van den Bosch was accused by the Congolese government of instigating unrest throughout the country. He was ordered to be expelled from the Congo, but did not receive any notice until the morning of 9 August when a Congolese Foreign Ministry official informed him that he had until noon that day to leave. Facing a large crowd of angry Congolese, van den Bosch left the Belgian embassy under the escort of United Nations peacekeepers to the docks, where he took a boat to Brazzaville and from there flew back to Belgium.

Citations

References 

 

1910 births
1985 deaths
People of the Congo Crisis
Ambassadors of Belgium to the Democratic Republic of the Congo